Turn the Tide may refer to:

 Turn the Tide (album), a 1989 album by Baillie & the Boys
 "Turn the Tide" (Johnny Hates Jazz song), 1989
 "Turn the Tide" (Sylver song), 2000

See also
 Turn the Tides, an album by 38th Parallel